Volker Staab (born 25 December 1957) is a German architect.

Life 
Born in Heidelberg, Staab studied architecture from 1977 bis 1983 at the ETH Zürich (Diploma Architect ETH). In the same year, he collaborated on the design for the Kunstmuseum Bonn.

He has been a freelance architect since 1990. In 1991 he founded the architectural practice Volker Staab. Since 1996 he has worked in partnership with Alfred Nieuwenhuizen under Staab Architekten, since 2007 as Staab Architekten GmbH.

In 2002-2004 Staab took on a visiting scholar position at the Technische Universität Berlin. In 2002, he also received a lectureship at the Academy of Fine Arts, Nuremberg. In 2005, he became a visiting professor at the FH Münster and taught there until 2007. From 2008 to 2009, Staab held the deputy chair of architecture/public spaces and buildings at the Staatliche Akademie der Bildenden Künste Stuttgart. Since 2012 he has held the professorship for design and spatial composition at the TU Braunschweig.

Memberships 
Staab is a member of the Bund Deutscher Architekten (since 1997), a member of the Academy of Arts, Berlin (since 2005) und des Beirats der  in Potsdam (since 2007). Since 2013 he has been a member of the board of trustees of the IBA Heidelberg and since 2014 a member of the Berlin State Monuments Council.

Buildings 

 1992–1994: Extension of the Maximilianeum, Munich
 1992–1999: Neues Museum Nürnberg
 1997–2000: Museum Georg Schäfer, Schweinfurt
 2002–2004: Service Centre at the Theresienwiese, Munich
 2000-2005: Maximilianeum, redesign of the plenary hall of the Bavarian State Parliament, Munich
 2002-2006: German Embassy Mexico, Chancery Building, Mexico City
 2002-2007: University of Heidelberg - New building Bioquant
 2004–2007: Museum Gunzenhauser, Chemnitz
 2004–2010:  Dresden, Sanierung und Neubau Zentraldepot
 2008–2010: Erweiterung des 's NYA Nordiska, Dannenberg
 2004–2011: University of Potsdam, Informations-, Kommunikations- und Medienzentrum Golm.
 2005–2011: New Gallery, Kassel
 2006–2011: Bergpark Wilhelmshöhe, Besucherzentrum Bad Wilhelmshöhe
 2009–2011: Museum of the Bavarian Kings, Hohenschwangau
 2010-2012: Nano-Bioanalytics Centre NBZ, Münster
 2005–2013: Westphalian State Museum of Art and Cultural History, Münster.
 2008–2013: .
 2008–2013: Ministry of the Interior of the State of Baden-Württemberg, Stuttgart
 2010–2015: Conversion and extension of the Richard-Wagner-Museum
 2013–2016: General renovation and conversion of the House of the Landtage, Stuttgart
 since 2016: Erweiterungsbau Bauhaus Archive
 2009–2017: , Potsdam
 since 2017: Residential complex, Landsberg am Lech (Civil engineer: Michael Heubl).
 2018: Sanierung und Erweiterung Zeughaus München zur Fakultät für Design der Hochschule München University of Applied Sciences.
 2013–2019: Berlin Institute for Medical Systems Biology
 2013–2014: Willy-Brandt-Schule (Warsaw), Deutsch-Polnische 
 2015–2019: .
 2008–2020: Augustinerhof, Nürnberg
 2013–2020: Rehabilitation and expansion of the Jewish Museum Frankfurt.
 2020: Protestant Centre, Augsburg.

Prizes 
 1995: BDA-Preis Bayern for expansion of the Bavarian Parliament, Munich
 2000: Preis für Stadtbildpflege der Stadt München for expansion of the Bavarian Parliament
 Architekturpreis Beton (2001; 2014) for Museum Georg Schäfer, Schweinfurt, and Visitor Centre at the Herkules, Kassel
 2001: Deutscher Natursteinpreis for New Museum Nuremberg
 2005:  for Servicezentrum, Theresienwiese München
 2005: , Award, for Service Centre on the Theresienwiese, Munich
 2009:  of the BDA Baden-Württemberg for Heidelberg University, new building Bioquant
 2010: Architekturpreis 2010 of the BDA Saxony for Museum Gunzenhauser, Chemnitz
 2011: Deutscher Architekturpreis for Albertinum Dresden, Redevelopment and new construction of depository
 2012:  for NYA Nordiska, Dannenberg
 2012:  for Erweiterung des Firmensitzes von Nya Nordiska, Dannenberg
 2013: Nike in der Kategorie Fügung for NYA Nordiska, Dannenberg
 2013: Deutscher Fassadenpreis für vorgehängte hinterlüftete Fassaden for  der Hochschule Darmstadt
 2013: , Perfection of detail category, for Museum of the Bavarian Kings, Hohenschwangau
 2014: Landesbaupreis Mecklenburg-Vorpommern for the Kunstmuseum Ahrenshoop
 2014: Deutscher Hochschulbaupreis für Informations-, Kommunikations- und Medienzentrum der Universität Potsdam
 2017: Deutscher Architekturpreis, Auszeichnung, for Generalsanierung Haus des Landtags, Stuttgart
 2017: Bayerischer Staatspreis Bauen im Bestand for Richard Wagner Museum, Bayreuth
 2018: Deutscher Städtebaupreis, Auszeichnung, for LWL-Museum für Kunst und Kultur, Münster
 2018: Hugo-Häring-Landespreis des BDA Baden-Württemberg für Haus des Landtags, Stuttgart.
 2018: Bundespreis Europäische Stadt, 3. Preis, für Jüdisches Gemeindezentrum mit Synagoge, Regensburg
 2019: Architekturpreis Regensburg, Jüdisches Gemeindezentrum mit Synagoge, Regensburg
 2019: Deutscher Architekturpreis, award for Science and Restoration Centre, Potsdam

References

External links 

 
 

20th-century German architects
21st-century German architects
Academic staff of the Technical University of Braunschweig
Members of the Academy of Arts, Berlin
Recipients of the Cross of the Order of Merit of the Federal Republic of Germany
1957 births
Living people
People from Heidelberg